Molecular Neurobiology is a bimonthly peer-reviewed scientific journal covering all aspects of molecular neuroscience. It was established in 1987 and is published by Springer Science+Business Media. The editor-in-chief is Benedict C. Albensi (Nova Southeastern University). Dr. Albensi is an American-born (greater New York area) full professor and chair of the department of pharmaceutical sciences and highly accomplished in neuroscience research and academic administration.

Abstracting and indexing 
The journal is abstracted and indexed in:

According to the Journal Citation Reports, the journal has a 2020 impact factor of 5.590.

References

External links 
 

Neuroscience journals
Springer Science+Business Media academic journals
Bimonthly journals
English-language journals
Publications established in 1987